Lapporten (Swedish: "The Lapponian Gate") or Tjuonavagge (Northern Sami: Čuonjávággi, "Goose Valley") is a U-shaped valley located just outside Abisko National Park in Lapland in northern Sweden, one of the most familiar natural sights of the mountains there. The valley is bounded to the southwest of the mountain Nissuntjårro (1,738 m) and in the northeast of Tjuonatjåkka (1,554 m). In the middle of the valley lies Lake Čuonjájávri, 950 metres above sea level. The terrain is easy to walk but has no marked trail. Lapporten is in the Nissuntjårro Natura 2000 site.

References

Valleys of Sweden
Kiruna
Landforms of Norrbotten County